The 2010 FIRS Intercontinental Cup was the twelfth edition of the roller hockey tournament known as the Intercontinental Cup, played on March 21, 2010 at Reus, Spain. Reus Deportiu won the cup, defeating CD Petroleros YPF.

Match

See also
FIRS Intercontinental Cup

References

International roller hockey competitions hosted by Spain
FIRS Intercontinental Cup
2010 in roller hockey
2010 in Spanish sport